Jayasree Kalathil is an Indian writer, translator, mental health researcher and activist. She is known for her work in the area of mental health activism as well as for her translations of Malayalam works, The Diary of a Malayali Madman and Moustache, the former winning Crossword Book Award and the latter, the JCB Prize for Literature, both in 2020.

Biography 
Jayasree Kalathil was born in Kottakkal, a town in Malappuram district of the south Indian state of Kerala. After completing college education at Farook College, Kozhikode, and the Department of English, University of Calicut, she pursued her research at the English and Foreign Languages University, Hyderabad under the guidance of the noted activist and writer, Susie Tharu, which earned her a doctoral degree. Before moving to the UK, she worked as a researcher at Bapu Trust for Research on Mind & Discourse, Pune, Infochange India, Pune, and as a research fellow on mental health at Anveshi Research Centre for Women's Studies, Hyderabad.

Jayasree Kalathil lives in London.

Work in mental health and anti-racism 
Kalathil has been involved with the international Psychiatric survivors movement since the 1990s and her initial work in this area was around women's mental distress and its representation in literature and cinema. At 'Bapu Trust', Pune, she served as the founding editor of Aaina, the first Indian newsletter dedicated to mental health advocacy. After moving to the UK, she worked as a researcher at the Mental Health Media, London, and the Centre for Mental Health, London. In 2007, she set up the virtual collective, Survivor Research, a platform for research, activism and advocacy to highlight and challenge the institutional racism embedded in psychiatric practice and knowledge. She has worked as a consultant policy advisor at the Afiya Trust, London, an organization combatting racial inequalities in health, simultaneously managing 'Catch-a-Fiya', a national network of mental health service users and survivors from racially minoritised communities in the UK, and the National BME Mental Health Advocacy Project. She also co-chaired the Social Perspectives Network from 2009 to 2012, and served as the editor of 'Open Mind', a mental health magazine during 2010–2012.

In 2012, Kalathil was one of the four coordinators of 'The Inquiry into the ‘Schizophrenia’ Label', a campaign which aimed to question the usefulness of ‘schizophrenia’ as a diagnosis and medical condition, and investigated the impact this diagnosis on people's lives. She was one of the founding editors, with Jhilmil Breckenridge, of 'Mad in Asia Pacific', an online platform, founded in 2018, for voices from the Asia-Pacific region that offer a critical examination and rethinking of mental health, madness and disability. She is also involved with a project mapping the knowledge produced by psychiatric survivors and persons with psychosocial disabilities.

As a survivor researcher, Kalathil has written about the experiences of people at the intersection of madness and racism. Her study, Recovery and Resilience, explored the personal experiences of mental distress and recovery of Black and Asian women in the UK, narrated through life story narrative interviews, and Dancing to Our Own Tunes, a review done by her, deals with the experiences of Black and Asian mental health service users within the survivor movement and its user involvement spaces; the report was subsequently came up for discussion in the UK Parliament. She has also co-authored a textbook, Values and Ethics in Mental Health: An Exploration for Practice.

Literary career 
Kalathil is the author of The Sackclothman, a book for children a book under the 'Different Tales' project, which has since been translated into Indian languages such as Hindi, Telugu and Malayalam. In 2019, Harper Collins published her work, Diary of a Malayali Madman, the translation of five novellas, written by Malayalam writer, N. Prabhakaran. The publishing company contracted her again for the translation of Meesha, a controversial novel written by S. Hareesh which was subsequently published under the title, Moustache in 2020.

Awards and honors 
In 2011, the Mental Health Foundation selected Kalathil's work on the Recovery and Resilience project for the Janice Sinson Research Prize. She received the Crossword Book Award in 2020, for Diary of a Malayali Madman, the translation of N. Prabhakaran's novellas.

People from Malappuram district
Mental health activists
British writers of Indian descent
British translators
British social scientists
British social sciences writers
Year of birth missing (living people)
Living people
Writers from Kerala